Trace is a Russian crime drama television series about employees of Federal Expert Service ('FES'), the fictional organization. 
It was broadcast on the Channel One Russia from September 3, 2007 till August 25, 2011 (Monday – Thursday, night TV broadcast). According to Alexander Levin, Producer, the idea of the TV-series belonged to Konstantin Ernst. From September 5, 2011 premiere episodes are broadcast on Petersburg – Channel 5. The show continues to have high ratings.

FES 

The show tells the story of new governmental body created in MVD to solve X files and high crimes cases. FES is Federal Expert Service, bringing together specialists in various areas: software development, ballistics, forensic and investigators. FES is doing the whole range of expertise and researches, and it is investigating the most complex and intricate crimes. Launched as an experiment, FES trains young professionals and it assists to other special organizations as FSB and MVDs branches in solving crimes. Any investigator or detective, people from the Prosecutor's Office and a police officer can ask FES for a help.
There was futuristic office created especially for shooting: laboratory, a meeting room, a morgue, interrogation room and so on. There was number of cases when Russian citizens complained to FES, because they were not aware that the organization shown in the TV-series was fictional. Press Service of the Ministry of Internal Affairs for the Primorye Territory asked residents to beware of scams that have long posed as employees of FES.

При создании телесериала авторы вдохновлялись американским телесериалом « CSI: Crime Scene Investigation.». По словам продюсера Александра Левина, идея создания телесериала принадлежала Константину Эрнсту. Является самым продолжительным российским телесериалом по количеству серий.

Creators 
 General Producer — Alexander Levin
 Executive Producer — Boris Kokin
 Directors — Vsevolod Aravin (Episodes 1 - 40), Yury Kharnas (from Episode 41)
 Chief Editor — Alexander Shuravin
 Film Directors — Armen Aruryunyan-Eletsky, Petr Krotenko, Salavat Vakhitov, Kamil Zakirov and others.
 Writers — Alexander Shuravin, Anastasiya Demidova, Alexey Demidov, Pavel Peskov, Kirill Pletner, Vasily Koryakin, Darya Kokorina and others.

Cast 
 Olga Koposova — Galina Rogozina, Police Colonel, MD, The Head of FES (from Episode 1)
 Vladimir Tashlikov — Nikolai Kruglov, Major Police Senior Officer, Deputy Head of FES (from Episode 1)
 Anna Dankova — Valentina Antonova, The Medical Examiner (from Episode 1)
 Vladimir Sveshnikov — Peter Romashin, professor and Medical Examiner (Episodes 1 - 409, Episode 551)
 Yevgeny Kulakov — Ivan Tikhonov, programmer, biologist and The Head of The Computer Department (Episode 1)
 Olga Zeyger — Tatyana Belaya, ballistics, Lieutenant / Captain of Police, detective (Episodes 2 – 335, from Episode 928)
 Pavel Shuvaev — Sergey Maysky, Major of GRU, Senior Officer. Biker. (from Episode 3)
 Tatyana Isakova — Daria Maximova, programmer, chemist (Episodes 23 – 110)
 Andrey Lavrov — Constantine Kotov, Police Captain, detective (Episodes 25 – 909, from Episode 1060)
 Sergey Pioro — Igor Shustov, Police Captain, ballistics, detective (from Episode 27)
 Georgy Teslya-Gerasimov — Konstantin Lisitsyn, Major Police Senior Officer (from Episode 27)
 Oleg Osipov — Sergey Belozerov, programmer, biologist (Episodes 31 – 508)
 Olga Nedovodina — Ekaterina Gordeeva, Major Police Senior Officer (Episodes 39 – 90)
 Anastasia Gruzdeva — Alla Semenchuk, Assistant (Episodes 87 – 489)
 Elena Golovisina — Elena Shustova, Senior Police Lieutenant, programmer, the wife of Igor Shustov (Episodes 118 – 242)
 Julia Vaishnur — Julia Sokolova, The Captain of Police, detective (Episodes 118 – 553)
 Anastasia Gulimova — Oxana Amelina, Senior Police Lieutenant, programmer (from Episode 263)
 Oleg Valkman — Boris Selivanov, medical examiner, a former plastic surgeon (Episodes 448 — 2538)
 Stanislav Erklievskiy — Paul Granik, Captain of Police, detective (from Episode 547)
 Ruslan Sasin — Andrew Kholodov, Police Captain, programmer (from Episode 566)
 Nina Gogaeva — Margarita Vlasova, Police Captain, detective (Episodes 572 – 847)
 Sergey Kovalenko — Stepan Danilov, Captain of Police, detective (from Episode 632)
 Vladislav Malenko — Roman Aristov, Major Police Senior Officer (from Episode 668)
 Alexandra Popova — Olga Dunayeva, Senior Lieutenant of Police, detective (from Episode 925)
 Marianna Kataeva — Alyona, Office Manager.'' (Episodes 4 – 57)
 Sergey Lavigin — Andrei Romanov, trainee, an employee of FES (Episodes 17, 21)
 Elena Lander — Vika
 Alexey Kulichkov — Alexei Vinogradov, Police Captain, an employee of FES (Episodes 23, 24, 26)
 Elena Nikitina — Victoria Gromova, programmer, replaces Ivan Tikhonov (Episodes 24, 27)
 Oleg Zhiritskiy — Valery, trainee, an employee of FES (Episodes 26, 28, 29, 30, 33)
 Irina Medvedeva — Daria Gordeeva, Laboratory Assistant, replaces Ivan Tikhonov (Episode 32)
 Nikolay Vinogradov — Captain of FES (Episodes 90 – 102)
 Valeria Skorokhodova — Anna Shmeleva, Police Captain, ballistics (Episodes 385, 388, 390)
 Vladimir Smirnov — Andrey Morozov, Senior Police Lieutenant, programmer (Episodes 545, 548, 550, 551)
 Vsevolod Grinevskiy — Ilya Danilov, detective (Episodes 613, 614)
 Ekaterina Pilipenko — Olga Gorokhova, Senior Lieutenant of Police, detective (Episodes 868, 880)
 Sergey Batrak - Bubnov, expert on antiques (Episode 859)
 Elena Khlibko — Taisya Kaplevich, witness during interrogation (Episode 1062)
 Mariya Fomina — Varya Golinskaya

Production 
The filming process is very intensive: six episodes in one time. In the first months of the project, shooting could be up to 18 hours per day, then - up to 12 hours. Many actors, including leading actors, did not survive the rhythm of the shooting and left the project. At the time of filming an Episode 450 there were already 3500 actors.

Awards and nominations
TEFI Award:
2009 Best TV series
2011 Best TV series
2012 Best Director of TV film / series 
Prize of The Association of Professional Producers of Film and Television in TV-Movie:
2014 Best TV series 
2015 Best TV series

References

External links
 TV-series on Ruskino
 Official Webpage at Petersburg – Channel 5

Channel One Russia original programming
2000s Russian television series
2010s Russian television series
Russian crime television series
Russian workplace drama television series
Russian-language television shows
Russian police procedural television series
2007 Russian television series debuts
Russian television series based on American television series